Events in the year 1929 in Spain.

Incumbents
Monarch: Alfonso XIII
President of the Council of Ministers: Miguel Primo de Rivera

Births
20 March – Germán Robles, Spanish-Mexican actor (d. 2015)
15 May - Juanjo Menéndez. (d. 1976)
25 July - Manuel Olivencia, Spanish economist, diplomat (d. 2018)
1 November - Francisco Macián. (d. 2003)
14 December – Fernando Sebastián Aguilar, cardinal (d. 2019)
27 December - Lucio Muñoz. (d. 1998)

Deaths
 Julio Cervera Baviera.
 March 25 - Ruperto Biete. (b. 1906)
 June 28 - Diego Arias de Miranda. (b. 1845)

References

 
Years of the 20th century in Spain
1920s in Spain
Spain
Spain